The 1939–40 Lehigh Engineers men's ice hockey season was the inaugural season of play for the program. The Engineers represented Lehigh University and were coached by Charles W. Simmons in his 1st season.

Season
After receiving financial backing from the university, the ice hockey team was able to become a varsity squad for the first time in 1939. The outfit also joined the newly formed Pennsylvania Intercollegiate Hockey League, however, since the circuit included non-collegiate team it was only an informal conference. Lehigh began the season well with a credible performance against Penn, followed by their first win over the Cubs. At the time, Ray Anderson was leading the league scoring with 5 points, however, the team's offense dried up after that. The Engineers scored just 4 goals in their final three games and ended the season on a down note, getting thumped by Penn State 2–8.

W. Rodman Turner served as team manager with Allen H. Zane and Arthur L. Fisher as assistants.

Roster

Standings

Schedule and results

|-
!colspan=12 style=";" | Regular Season

† Both Pennsylvania and Penn State fielded club teams at this time.

References

External links

Lehigh Mountain Hawks men's ice hockey seasons
Lehigh
Lehigh
Lehigh
Lehigh